iWar is the term used by NATO to describe a form of Internet-based warfare.

iWar comparisons
iWar is distinct in that, information warfare pertains to issues of intelligence. Whereas cyber-warfare and cyber-terrorism, pertain to issues of extelligence. These refer to degrees of sensitivity in military and infrastructure assets, battlefield communications and satellite tactical assessments.  iWar refers to attacks carried out over the Internet, that target specific assets within Internet superstructure, for example: websites that provide access to online services.

iWar attack
iWar has an example in having been conducted by denial-of-service attacks, using high volume bombardment during information requests, bottlenecking Internet based computer networking.

In the future
The two trends of increasing vulnerability over the Internet and ease of attack make conflagration of iWar probable.

2008 Russia-Georgian conflict
The 2008 South Ossetia war heralded the arrival of iWar.

See also

References

Further reading
Wang, Xiangsui et al. (2002). Unrestricted Warfare: China's Master Plan to Destroy America. Pan American Publishing Company.

External links

IWS - The Information Warfare Site
Institute for the Advanced Study of Information Warfare (IASIW)

Cyberwarfare
Information operations and warfare
Propaganda techniques
Psychological warfare techniques
Warfare post-1945